Vincent Ledoux (born 21 June 1966) is a French politician of Agir who has been serving as a member of the French National Assembly since 18 June 2017, representing the 10th constituency of the department of Nord.

Political career 
In the Republicans' 2016 primaries, Ledoux endorsed Nicolas Sarkozy as the party's candidate for the 2017 French presidential election. 

In parliament, Ledoux serves on the Finance Committee. He was previously a member of the Committee on Cultural Affairs and Education from 2016 until 2019.

He was substitute for Gérald Darmanin at the 2022 French legislative election, and replaced him when he was reappointed to the Borne government.

See also
 2017 French legislative election

References

1966 births
Living people
People from Watermael-Boitsfort
Rally for the Republic politicians
Union of Democrats and Independents politicians
The Republicans (France) politicians
Agir (France) politicians
Deputies of the 14th National Assembly of the French Fifth Republic
Deputies of the 15th National Assembly of the French Fifth Republic

Deputies of the 16th National Assembly of the French Fifth Republic